Sheriff Teddy is an East German film. It was released in 1957.

External links
 

1957 films
East German films
1950s German-language films
Films set in Berlin
Films based on German novels
German children's films
Films directed by Heiner Carow
1950s German films